Good Enough is the second studio album by Swedish pop singer Ola. The album originally debuted and peaked at number six on the Swedish Albums Chart, however it reached a new peak at number 2 when the album was re-released with a new track listing in 2008.

Track listing

"S.O.S." (3:12)
"Totally Addicted" (3:43)
"Natalie" (3:08)
"My Addiction" (3:30)
"If You Gave Me Your Love" (3:21)
"Good Enough" (3:59)
"Can't Get Enough" (3:14)
"All It Takes" (3:24)
"Baby Girl" (3:04)
"Baby I'm Yours" (3:39)
"Who I Am" (3:45)

Charts

The Feelgood Edition
Following Ola's participation in Melodifestivalen 2008, with the song "Love in Stereo", the album was re-released as Good Enough - The Feelgood Edition. Consisting of his Melodifestivalen entry, as well as the follow up single "Feelgood" and a few remixes, the album re-entered the Swedish Albums Chart and reached a new peak position at number two.

Re-release track listing
"S.O.S." (3:12)
"Totally Addicted" (3:43)
"Natalie" (3:08)
"My Addiction" (3:30)
"If You Gave Me Your Love" (3:21)
"Good Enough" (3:59)
"Can't Get Enough" (3:14)
"All It Takes" (3:24)
"Baby Girl" (3:04)
"Baby I'm Yours" (3:39)
"Who I Am" (3:45)
"Feelgood" (3:31)
"Natalie" (Radio version) [Stockholm-Uppsala remix] (6:43)
"S.O.S." [Stockholm-Uppsala remix] (3:36)
"If You Gave Me Your Love" (Recorded at P3 Live) (3:39)
"Love in Stereo" (3:00)

Charts

References

2007 albums
Ola Svensson albums